János Börzsei (9 October 1921 – 30 August 2007)  was a former Hungarian footballer. He won a gold medal with the Hungarian national team at the 1952 Summer Olympics in Helsinki, Finland, but he did not play in any matches.

Honours
MTK Budapest
Nemzeti Bajnokság I: 1951, 1953, 1957–58

References

External links
 
 

1921 births
2007 deaths
Footballers from Budapest
Hungarian footballers
Hungary international footballers
Footballers at the 1952 Summer Olympics
Olympic footballers of Hungary
Olympic gold medalists for Hungary
Olympic medalists in football
Medalists at the 1952 Summer Olympics
Nemzeti Bajnokság I players
MTK Budapest FC players
Liga I players
Hungarian expatriate footballers
Hungarian expatriate sportspeople in Romania
Expatriate footballers in Romania
Association football defenders